The Oreet (pl. Ortinuek or Ortinweek) is a kinship group among the Kalenjin people of Kenya that is similar in concept to a clan. The members of an oreet were not necessarily related by blood as evidenced by the adoption of members of the Uasin Gishu Maasai by Arap Sutek, the only Nandi smith at the time. His proteges would later be adopted into almost every other clan as smiths. More famously, the lineage of the Talai Orkoiik were adopted members of the Segelai Maasai.

Description

Membership and identification by Oreet traditionally served the purpose of regulating marriage (by prevent inbreeding since marriage within Oreet was largely not permitted), arbitrating in murder cases and a support system when payment of blood money was required. 
  
In modern Kenya, identification by oreet is declining among the Nandi and Kalenjin. However oreet histories have consequently gained prominence as a means of studying the settlement and formation of the Nandi sub-tribe of the Kalenjin. Like the wider Kalenjin Occupation of the Rift, a look at the individual Nandi clan histories shows that the narrative of origin, though containing elements of truth, largely over simplifies the formation of the Nandi sub-tribe.

Sub-tribe
The Nandi sub-tribe was formed through the settlement of the Nandi region by members of various Kalenjin clans from different regions. The traditional Nandi account is that the first settlers in their country came from Elgon, and formed the Kipoiis clan; a name that possibly means 'the spirits'. They were led by a man named Kakipoch, founder of the Nandi section of the Kalenjin. They are said to have settled in the emet (county) of Aldai in south-western Nandi. Kakipoch's people were later joined by a few Kipsikis, who were then followed by people from the other Kalenjin branches.

Settlement
The account of settlement by the 17 clans present in the early decades of the 20th century is as follows;

 From Elgon & Lumbwa (Kipsigis)
Kipoiis
Kipamwi
Kipkenda
Kipiegen

 From Lumbwa (Kipsigis)
Tungo
Kipaa
Kipasiso and Kapchemuri (Chemuri)
Elgoni (Kony)

 From Elgon
Kipkokos

 From Elgon & Elgeyo
Kipsirgio
Moi
Sokom
Kiptopkei
Kamwaikei

 From Lo-'sekelae Masai
Kipkoiitim (also partly from Elgon)
Talai, the medicine men's clan (partly also from Kamasya)
Toyoi

The Nandi ortinuek are each identified by an 'animal' or tiondo, which no clan member could hunt. Clan symbols (tiondo) range from birds, wild animals, frog and snake to bees. Although the sun is not an animal, 'she' has oreet and is called 'tiondo' in the same sense as a lion.

 Kipkenda Maimi
Segemiat (bee)
 Kiboiis
Lelwoot (jackal)
Solopchoot (coackroach)
 Mooi
Kong'oony (Crested Crane)
Soeet (Buffalo)
Kergeng, Cheptirkiichet (Dik-dik)
Kipkamoriet
Kogos, Chepkogosiot (Eagle)
 Kipsirgoi
Toreet (palee kut ak kutung')
 Kipamui
Kergeng (Antelope)
 Sogoom
Chepsirereet (Hawk)
 Talai
Ng'etuny, Lion (Kuutwo, Talai Orkoi)
Ng'etuny, Lion (Talai Nandi)
 Kipoongoi (che kwees tibiik)
Taiyweet
 Kibiegen (kap rat setio let)
Moseet (Monkey)
Muriat (rat)
 Kipaa (koros)
Ndareet (Snake)
Tisiet (Baboon)
 Toiyoi (moriso)
Ropta (rain)
Birechik (Safari Ants)
 Kap Oiit
Beliot, kiramkeel koe mooi (Elephant)
Kipleng'wet (rabbit)
chameleon
 Kipasiiso (Kap koluu)
Asista (Sun)
 Kuchwa
Mororochet (frog)
 Tungo (korap oor)
Kimageetiet (Hyena)
 Kiptabkei
Chereret (vervet monkey)

Notable Oreet Customs

It is claimed that Kong'ony (crested crane) was the first animal allocated a family. Hence Moi (Kong'ony) is regarded as the 'leader' and in child stories this is shown as the source of babies in a family.

The Hyena (Kimageet, oreet of Tungo, korap oor) is claimed to have been the last tiondo to be allocated and comes along with several rules of favour (ostensibly to hide the fact that it was the last). Hence, even though the Nandi claim 'Cheptaab oreet age ne wendi oreet age' literally 'a daughter from one clan goes to another clan and belongs in the new clan', to mean a woman has no clan, the Tungo girls are permitted to retain their clan identity.

Kiboiis is the largest clan in Nandi. It comprises two tottems ("tiondo"): Solopchot (cockroach), also known as Mende Keruus and Lelwot (jackal), which was praised as "cherotei keringet agenge en kabula" (believed to be Keppler), which is Oreetab Kibois.  Kibois is used largely by two families: Kaprotuk and Kapchebwai. Other families with the clan are Kapcherige, Kaptot, and Kapcheptembur. Lelwek is normally praised in Kaprotuk, by their daughters but during Koito (prewedding).  Solobchot is widely mentioned (less praised).  Others use Lelwot interchangeably with Kaprotuk and Kapchebwai and regard each other as "oor mwendo". Earlier grandfathers especially from Kaprotuk were worried that the two families of Kaprotuk and Kapchebwai would "moiyo tiondo" (each will claim Lelwot is theirs).

References 

Clans
Kalenjin
Ethnic groups in Kenya